The Ulster Senior Club Football League is an annual Gaelic football tournament played in Ulster GAA between clubs who choose to enter. It starts with a group stage, with the group winners (and for 2008 the best group runner-up) advancing to the knockout stage. It is played in the early part of the year and is far less prestigious than the Ulster Senior Club Football Championship, with many sides viewing it as a warm-up to their respective county leagues and championships. However winning the Ulster Club League has proved a stepping stone for county championship success for several clubs.

History
The competition was the brainchild of former Gaelic Athletic Association President Seán Kelly who asked each province to come up with a cross-county club league competition. The tournament was first held in 2004 with Cavan Gaels emerging victorious.

Finals listed by year

See also
Ulster Senior Club Football Championship
Ulster Senior Club Hurling League

References

External links
Fixtures, results and tables for the 2008 Ulster Club League

Ulster GAA club football competitions
Gaelic football leagues in Ireland